Sage Moonblood Stallone (May 5, 1976 – July 13, 2012) was an American actor. He was the eldest child of actor Sylvester Stallone.

Early life
Sage Stallone was born in Los Angeles, California, the elder son and first child of Sasha Czack and actor Sylvester Stallone. He was the brother of Seargeoh "Seth" Stallone, and half-brother of Sophia, Sistine, and Scarlet Stallone. He was the nephew of actor and singer Frank Stallone, and grandson of Jackie Stallone. His stepmother was model and entrepreneur Jennifer Flavin.

Stallone graduated from Montclair College Preparatory School in Van Nuys, California, in 1993, and then studied filmmaking for a year at the University of North Carolina School of the Arts.

Career
As a child, Stallone made a guest appearance on Gorgeous Ladies of Wrestling, a series that was promoted by his grandmother, Jackie Stallone.

Stallone made his acting debut alongside his father Sylvester Stallone in Rocky V (1990), the fifth installment of the Rocky franchise, playing Robert Balboa Jr., the onscreen son of his father's title character. He also appeared with his father in Daylight (1996).

In 1996, Stallone and film editor Bob Murawski co-founded Grindhouse Releasing, a Los Angeles-based company dedicated to the restoration and preservation of exploitation films such as Cannibal Holocaust and Gone with the Pope.

In 2006, he did not reprise his Rocky role in Rocky Balboa because he was working on his own film, Vic, his directorial debut. He also wrote and produced the film, which won the "Best New Filmmaker" award at the 2006 Boston Film Festival.

His last projects were appearances in Vincent Gallo's last two films, Promises Written in Water and The Agent. Both films were shown in main competition at the 2010 Venice Film Festival and in the Toronto International Film Festival. A photograph of Stallone as a young child beside his father appears in the 2015 Creed, where it is stated that his character, Robert Balboa Jr., has since moved away to Vancouver.

Death
Stallone was found dead on July 13, 2012, at his home in Studio City, Los Angeles. According to reports, he had not been heard from for four days prior to his death. An autopsy by the Los Angeles coroner and toxicology tests determined that Stallone died of coronary artery disease caused by atherosclerosis, with no drugs detected other than an over-the-counter pain remedy. At the time of his death, Stallone was reportedly engaged. Stallone's funeral was held on July 21 at St. Martin of Tours Catholic Church in Los Angeles. He is interred at Westwood Village Memorial Park Cemetery.

Filmography

References

External links
 
 

1976 births
2012 deaths
20th-century American male actors
21st-century American male actors
Male actors from Los Angeles
American male child actors
American male film actors
American film producers
American people of French descent
American people of Italian descent
Burials at Westwood Village Memorial Park Cemetery
University of North Carolina School of the Arts alumni
People from Studio City, Los Angeles
Film directors from Los Angeles
Family of Sylvester Stallone
Deaths from coronary artery disease
Deaths from atherosclerosis
Montclair College Preparatory School alumni